Silvio Wille (born 16 May 1966) is a Liechtensteiner former alpine skier who competed in the 1988 Winter Olympics.

References

External links
 

1966 births
Living people
Liechtenstein male alpine skiers
Olympic alpine skiers of Liechtenstein
Alpine skiers at the 1988 Winter Olympics
Place of birth missing (living people)